The Ford Freda was a badge engineered version of the 8-seater Mazda Bongo Friendee minivan, introduced to the Japanese partner home market by the American automaker Ford in 1995. 

Most examples of this vehicle are automatics (there are a few manual versions), and are available in 2WD (SGL3) and 4WD (SGL5) versions. 2.5 turbo diesels are common in Japan, although V6 petrol engines are starting to appear. Later (post 99) models are a different shape and have different engines. Air conditioning (often with climate control), and Electronic Blinds are fitted as standard.

Camping Versions
Some Bongo Friendee/Fredas have Mazda factory-fitted kitchen units, but many others are imported and converted to camper vans in the United Kingdom. All have fold-down seats downstairs to make a double bed, and on many models there is also an elevating roof where you can sleep two more. Flat-top versions (or "Bongolows") are also available.

External links
Technical Information and Specifications

Freda
Minivans
Rear-wheel-drive vehicles
Cars introduced in 1995